Lidiya Tsymosh (born 27 March 1942) is a Ukrainian athlete. She competed in the women's javelin throw at the 1968 Summer Olympics, representing the Soviet Union.

References

1942 births
Living people
Athletes (track and field) at the 1968 Summer Olympics
Ukrainian female javelin throwers
Olympic athletes of the Soviet Union
Sportspeople from Lviv
Soviet female javelin throwers